Holly Gibbs (born 25 August 1997) is an English child actress known for having played in The Story of Tracy Beaker as Milly and Nanny McPhee as Christianna. She is the daughter of former actress Claire Toeman.  She appeared in TEENSVILLE (BBC), about the Jewish Bar Mitzvah celebration. She went on to study Art in London.

Filmography

Awards and nominations

References

External links
 

1997 births
English child actresses
Living people